Stainmore is a remote geographic area in the Pennines on the border of Cumbria, County Durham and North Yorkshire. The name is used for a civil parish in the Eden District of Cumbria, England, including the villages of North Stainmore and South Stainmore.  The parish had a population of 253 in the 2001 census, increasing to 264 at the Census 2011. Stainmore Forest stretches further east into County Durham, towards Bowes.

Geography 
Stainmore is drained by the River Belah and the River Balder. It is crossed by the Roman road from Bowes to Brough, now part of the A66, and formerly by the Stainmore Railway. Each of these lines of communication has made use of the relatively low broad saddle between the higher hills to north and south which is commonly referred to as the Stainmore Gap. The Gap is coincident with the Stainmore Summit Fault which throws the relatively flat-lying Carboniferous rocks of the area down to the south. It acted as a conduit for Lake District-originated ice to pass eastwards during one or more glacial periods. 
There are several Regionally Important Geological / Geomorphological Sites (RIGS) in the Stainmore area, and Bowes Moor is a Site of Special Scientific Interest. The locality gives its name to the Stainmore Trough, a geological structure originating during the Carboniferous period and which lies between the Alston Block to the north and the Askrigg Block to the south.

History 
The place-name 'Stainmore' is first attested in a document of circa 990, where it appears as Stanmoir. It appears as Stanmore in the Charter Rolls for the reign of Henry II, and as Staynmor in the Quo Warranto of 1292. The name means 'stony moor'.

According to Roger of Wendover, it was where Eric Bloodaxe (d. 954), recently expelled from York, was betrayed and killed, an event which some historians believe to have taken place in a great battle.
Ancient monuments include a Roman marching camp at Rey Cross  and, immediately east of the camp, the Rey Cross itself, also called Rere Cross (Scheduled monument, no. 32713).

The Ecclesiastical parish of Brough with Stainmore has two churches: St Michael's, Brough under Stainmore and  St Stephen's, South Stainmore. St Stephen's was built by Cuthbert Buckell in 1600 and rebuilt by Henry Tufton, 11th Earl of Thanet in 1842-3.

Gallery

See also

Listed buildings in Stainmore

References

Further reading

External links
 Cumbria County History Trust: Stainmore (nb: provisional research only – see Talk page)

Geography of Cumbria
Rey Cross
Civil parishes in Cumbria